A Gentle Creature is a 2017 drama film directed by Sergei Loznitsa. The film was created as an international co-production between France, Germany, the Netherlands, Russia, Latvia, Ukraine and Lithuania. It was selected to compete for the Palme d'Or in the main competition section at the 2017 Cannes Film Festival. The film is inspired by the 1876 short story of the same name by Fyodor Dostoyevsky.

Plot
A woman lives alone on the outskirts of a village in Russia. One day she receives a parcel she had sent to her incarcerated husband, marked 'return to sender'. Shocked and confused, the woman has no choice but to travel to the prison in a remote region of the country in search of an explanation. So begins the story of a battle against this impenetrable fortress, the prison where the forces of social evil are constantly at work. Braving violence and humiliation, in the face of all opposition, our protagonist embarks on a blind quest for justice.

Cast

 Vasilina Makovtseva
 Sergei Kolesov
 Dimitry Bykovsky
 Lia Akhedzhakova
 Vadim Dubovsky
 Roza Hajrullina
 Sergey Fedorov
 Marina Kleshcheva
 Alisa Kravtsova
 Sergei Russkin
 Alexander Zamuraev
 Svetlana Kolesova
 Valeriu Andriuta
 Nikolay Kolyada
 Konstantin Itunin
 Boris Kamorzin
 Anton Makushin
 Sergei Koshonin
 Viktor Nemets
 Elena Netesina

Production
The film was produced by Marianne Slot and Carine Leblanc for Slot Machine (France). Co producers are Valentina Mikhaleva, Galina Sementseva, Lev Karakhan, Gunnar Dedio, Uljana Kim, Peter Warnier, Marc van Warmerdam and Serge Lanrenyuk. A Gentle Creature was produced in coproduction with Arte France cinema, GP cinema company (Russia), LOOKSfilm (Germany), Studio Uljana Kim (Lithuania), Wild at Art & Graniet Film (The Netherlands), Solar Media Entertainment (Ukraine), in association with Wild Bunch, Haut et Court, Potemkine Films, Atoms & Void, Film Angels Studio and with the support of Eurimages, Aide aux Cinémas du Monde, Aide à la Coproduction Franco-Allemande, Centre National du Cinéma et de l'image Animée, Institut Français, Mitteldeutsche Medienförderung, Filmförderungsanstalt, Netherlands Film Fund, Netherlands Film Production Incentive, National Film Centre of Latvia, Riga Film Fund, Lithuanian Film Centre, Lithuanian National Radio and Television, and the Creative Europe Programme – Media of the European Union.

The film was shot in Latvia and Lithuania.

Reception

Box office
The budget of the film was 2,000,000 euros and the Russia Box Office figures are $6,837 (1,583 viewers in total) with 35.7% collected during the first weekend.

Critical reception
On review aggregator website Rotten Tomatoes, the film holds an approval rating of 76%, based on 34 reviews, and an average rating of 7.20/10. The website's critical consensus states, "A Gentle Creature isn't an easy watch, but this grim look at modern Russia's bureaucratic nightmare offers rich, thought-provoking rewards." On Metacritic, the film has a weighted average score of 78 out of 100, based on 10 critics, indicating "generally favorable reviews".

References

External links
 

2017 films
2017 drama films
2010s Russian-language films
Films directed by Sergei Loznitsa
Dutch drama films
French drama films
German drama films
Latvian drama films
Lithuanian drama films
Russian drama films
Ukrainian drama films
Films based on works by Fyodor Dostoyevsky
Films based on short fiction
2010s French films
2010s German films